Aslauga latifurca is a butterfly in the family Lycaenidae. It is found in Kenya, Malawi and Zambia.

References

External links
Images representing Aslauga latifurca at Barcodes of Life

Butterflies described in 1981
Aslauga